Thrum may refer to:

 Thrum (band), Scottish indie rock band
 Thrum (botany), a flower morph
 Thrum (material), small lengths of wool or yarn
 Thrum Hall, a rugby league stadium in Halifax, West Yorkshire, England
 Thrum Mill, Rothbury, Northumberland, England, a disused water mill
 Thomas George Thrum (20th century), American bookman
 Thrum, a 2017 album by Joe Henry

See also
 Thrums, a community in British Columbia, Canada
 Thrumming (disambiguation)